The Bahujan Samaj Party (BSP) is a national level political party in India that was formed to represent Bahujans (literally means "community in majority"), referring to Scheduled Castes, Scheduled Tribes, and Other Backward Classes (OBC), along with religious minorities. According to Kanshi Ram, when he founded the party in 1984, the Bahujans comprised 85 percent of India's population, but were divided into 6,000 different castes. The party claims to be inspired by the philosophy of Gautama Buddha, B. R. Ambedkar, Mahatma Jyotiba Phule, Narayana Guru, Periyar E. V. Ramasamy and Chhatrapati Shahuji Maharaj.

Kanshi Ram named his protégée, Mayawati, as his successor in 2001. The BSP has its main base in the Indian state of Uttar Pradesh where it was the second-largest party in the 2019 Indian general election with 19.3% of votes and third-largest in the 2022 Uttar Pradesh Legislative Assembly election with 12.88% of votes. Its election symbol is an elephant which is the same symbol historically used by Dr. Ambedkar's Scheduled Castes Federation.

Etymology 

"Bahujan" is a Pali term frequently found in Buddhist texts, and literally refers to "the many", or "the majority". It connotes the combined population of the Scheduled Castes and Scheduled Tribes, Scheduled tribes, Other Backward Classes, Muslims, and minorities who together constitute the demographic majority of India. The word "Bahujan" appears in the dictum "Bahujana Hitaya Bahujana Sukhaya", or "The benefit and prosperity of the many", articulated by Gautama Buddha.

In his writing, Dr.B. R. Ambedkar used the term to refer to the majority of people in society that experienced discrimination and oppression on the basis of caste. Jyotirao Phule used the term in a similar context, and compared the Bahujans of India to Slavery in the United States.Schedule Caste and Bahujan writers have suggested this proportion was 70 percent of the population.

History 

Bahujan Samaj Party was founded on the birth anniversary of B. R. Ambedkar (14 April 1984) by Kanshi Ram, who named former school teacher, Mayawati, as his successor of BSP in 2001. The party's power grew quickly with seats in the Legislative Assembly of Uttar Pradesh and the Lok Sabha, the lower house of the Parliament of India. In 1993, following the assembly elections, Mayawati formed a coalition with Samajwadi Party president Mulayam Singh Yadav as Chief Minister. On 2 June 1995, she withdrew support from his government, which led to a major incident where Yadav was accused of sending his zealots to keep her party legislators hostage at a Lucknow guest house and shout casteist abuses at her. Since this incident, they have regarded each other publicly as chief rivals. Mayawati then obtained support from the Bharatiya Janata Party (BJP) to become Chief Minister on 3 June 1995. In October 1995, the BJP withdrew their support and fresh elections were called after a period of President's Rule. In 2003, Mayawati resigned from her own government to prove that she was not "hungry for power" and asked the BJP-run Government of India to remove Union Tourism and Culture Minister, Jagmohan. In 2007, she began leading a BSP-formed government with an absolute majority for a full five-year term.

Silver jubilee 
The Bahujan Samaj Party on 14 April 2009 celebrated its silver jubilee. The Manywar Shri Kanshi Ramji Shahri Garib Awas Yojna housing scheme for poor was launched by Lucknow Development Authority (LDA). The role of Mayawati was discussed in BSP's success. A mass rally was organised in Lucknow with 10000 police personnel on duty. It was the 305th and largest rally of BSP since 1984. As per Observer Research Foundation, within 25 years BSP became third largest political party of India.

Views 
BSP believes in "Social Transformation and Economic Emancipation" of the "Bahujan Samaj". The Bahujan Samaj signifies the Bahujans as the Scheduled Castes (SC), the Scheduled Tribes (ST), and the Other Backward Castes (OBC). B. R. Ambedkar, a proponent of Bahujan rights, is their important ideological inspiration. The BSP also speaks in favor of religious minorities. The party claims not to be prejudiced against upper-caste Hindus. In 2008, while addressing the audience, Mayawati said: "Our policies and ideology are not against any particular caste or religion. If we were anti-upper caste, we would not have given tickets to candidates from upper castes to contest elections".

List of Chief Ministers

Chief Ministers of Uttar Pradesh

Electoral Performances

Success in 2007 
The results of the May 2007 Uttar Pradesh state assembly election saw the BSP emerge as a sole majority party, the first to do so since 1991. Mayawati began her fourth term as Chief Minister of Uttar Pradesh and took her oath of office along with 50 ministers of cabinet and state rank on 13 May 2007, at Rajbhawan in the state capital of Lucknow. Most importantly, the majority achieved in large part was due to the party's ability to take away majority of upper castes votes from their traditional party, the BJP.

The party could manage only 80 seats in 2012 as against 206 in 2007 assembly elections. BSP government was the first in the history of Uttar Pradesh to complete its full five-year term. On 26 May 2018, Ram Achal Rajbhar was replaced by R S Kushwaha as the president of UP unit.

2014 Lok Sabha Elections 
The 2014 national Lok Sabha elections saw the BSP become the third-largest national party of India in terms of vote percentage, having 4.2% of the vote across the country but gaining no seats.

2019 Lok Sabha Elctions Mahagathbandhan
Prior to the 2019 Lok Sabha elections, BSP formed a Mahagathbandhan. The Mahagathbandhan (or Grand Alliance), or simply the Gathbandhan (Alliance), is an anti-Congress, anti-BJP Indian political alliance formed in the run-up to the 2019 general election under the leadership of two former Chief Ministers of Uttar Pradesh, Akhilesh Yadav of the Samajwadi Party and Mayawati of the Bahujan Samaj Party, along with Ajit Singh's Rashtriya Lok Dal and several other political parties, contesting in different states of India.

The Mahagathbandhan won 15 seats out of 80 in Uttar Pradesh in 2019 Indian General Election.

Election results

Lok Sabha (Lower House)

Uttar Pradesh Legislative Assembly (Lower House)

Madhya Pradesh Legislative Assembly

Rajasthan Legislative Assembly

Chhattisgarh Legislative Assembly

Bihar Legislative Assembly

Delhi Legislative Assembly

Haryana Legislative Assembly

Himachal Pradesh Legislative Assembly

Jammu and Kashmir Legislative Assembly

Jharkhand Legislative Assembly

Karnataka Legislative Assembly

Kerala Legislative Assembly

Maharashtra Legislative Assembly

Punjab Legislative Assembly

Telangana Legislative Assembly

Uttarakhand Legislative Assembly

Gallery

See also 
 BAMCEF
 Dalit Shoshit Samaj Sangharsh Samiti
 Republican Party of India
 Samata Party
 Kanshi Ram
 Mayawati
 Jai Bhim
 R. S. Praveen Kumar
 Bahujan Volunteer Force

Further reading 

 Chandra, Kanchan. 2004. Why Ethnic Parties Succeed. Cambridge University Press.

References

External links 
 

 
Political parties established in 1984
1984 establishments in Delhi
National political parties in India
Ambedkarite political parties
Dalit politics